The houses at 838–862 Brightridge Street in the Perry South neighborhood of Pittsburgh, Pennsylvania, USA, were built in 1887 on both sides of what was then called Brighton Place. Twelve houses were built on the north side of the street and 13 were built on the south side. They are of similar size and floor plan to the row houses on Charles Street that were also built by William A. Stone, who later became governor of Pennsylvania.   The Brightridge Street row houses were listed on the National Register of Historic Places on March 1, 1984.

References

Houses completed in 1887
Houses in Pittsburgh
Houses on the National Register of Historic Places in Pennsylvania
National Register of Historic Places in Pittsburgh